The XVI Corps of the Ottoman Empire (Turkish: 16 ncı Kolordu or On Altıncı Kolordu) was one of the corps of the Ottoman Army. It was formed during World War I.

Formations

Order of Battle, August 1916, December 1916 
In August 1916, December 1916, the corps was structured as follows:

XVI Corps (Caucasus)
5th Division, 8th Division

Order of Battle, August 1917
In August 1917, the corps was structured as follows:

XVI Corps (Caucasus)
5th Division, 8th Division

Sources

Corps of the Ottoman Empire
Military units and formations of the Ottoman Empire in World War I